As Above, So Below is the title of various works of art named after the popular Hermetic maxim "As above, so below":

Film 
As Above, So Below (film), a 2014 found-footage horror film

Music 
As Above, So Below (Forced Entry album), 1991
As Above, So Below (Angel Witch album), 2012
As Above So Below (Azure Ray EP), 2012
As Above, So Below (Stonefield album), 2016
As Above, So Below (Sampa the Great album), 2022
As Above, So Below, a 1998 studio album by Barry Adamson
As Above So Below, a 2011 studio album by singer Anthony David
As Above So Below, a 2020 studio album by rapper Vinnie Paz
As Above So Below, a 2020 song from DJs Phoenix Lord & Saggian featuring Canadian singer Emjay
"As Above, So Below", a song from the Klaxons' debut album Myths of the Near Future
"As Above, So Below", a song from the Tom Tom Club's debut album Tom Tom Club
"As Above, So Below", a song from The Comsat Angels' album Land
"As Above, So Below", a song from Behemoth's album Zos Kia Cultus
"As Above, So Below", a song from Yngwie Malmsteen's debut album Rising Force
"As Above, So Below", a track from the soundtrack of the 2021 film, Zack Snyder's Justice League
"As Above, So Below", an instrumental from Manfred Mann's Earth Band's 1975 album Nightingales & Bombers
"All as Above So Below", a song from Hieroglyphics' album The Kitchen